Harry Eisenstat (October 10, 1915 – March 21, 2003) was a Major League Baseball (MLB) player who played from 1935 to 1942.

Early life
Eisenstat was born in Brooklyn, New York, and was Jewish. He attended James Madison High School in Brooklyn, New York, where, in 2008, he was inducted into its prestigious Wall of Distinction.

Career
He pitched for the Brooklyn Dodgers, Detroit Tigers, and Cleveland Indians. Eisenstat was 19 years old when he broke into the big leagues on May 19, 1935, with the Brooklyn Dodgers, the third-youngest player in the National League. In his Major League debut, he gave up 5 runs over 2 innings in a 9–6 loss to the Pittsburgh Pirates. On October 4, 1937, he was granted free agency and signed with the Detroit Tigers.

Eisenstat is best known for, while pitching for the Detroit Tigers in the first game of a doubleheader on the last day of the 1938 season, beating Bob Feller of the Cleveland Indians 4–1 despite Feller setting the Major League record for most strikeouts in a game (18). Earlier that season, he won both ends of a doubleheader in relief against the Philadelphia Athletics while teammate Hank Greenberg hit two home runs, causing their Tigers Manager, Mickey Cochrane, to warn the two of them to stay in their rooms that night because "the Jews in Detroit are going crazy."

In 1938 his four saves were sixth-most in the National League. The next season, Eisenstat was traded to the Cleveland Indians for future Hall-of-Famer outfielder Earl Averill. In 1938 his four saves were eighth-most in the National League. He finished his professional baseball career with the Indians.

Due to World War II, Eisenstat enlisted in the Army in 1942, ending his career in the MLB. Through 2010, he was 9th all-time in career ERA (3.80; directly behind Harry Feldman) among Jewish MLB players.

After the war, Eisenstat moved to Shaker Heights, Ohio, and opened a hardware store.

In 1993, Eisenstat was inducted into the Michigan Jewish Sports Hall of Fame. After his death in 2003, his papers were donated to the Western Reserve Historical Society in Cleveland, Ohio, where they are available to the serious scholar.

See also
List of select Jewish baseball players

References

External links

 Harry Eisenstat at SABR (Baseball BioProject)

1915 births
2003 deaths
Allentown Brooks players
Brooklyn Dodgers players
Cleveland Indians players
Dayton Ducks players
Detroit Tigers players
Jewish American baseball players
Jewish Major League Baseball players
Louisville Colonels (minor league) players
Major League Baseball pitchers
Sportspeople from Brooklyn
Baseball players from New York City
James Madison High School (Brooklyn) alumni
United States Army personnel of World War II
20th-century American Jews
21st-century American Jews